Chilanzar is one of 12 districts (tuman) of Tashkent, the capital of Uzbekistan.

Overview
It was founded in the rural suburb of Tashkent in 1956, named after the homonymous residential quarter and was established, as district, in 1981.

Chilanzar borders with the districts of Uchtepa, Shayxontoxur, Yunusabad, Yakkasaray and Sergeli. It borders also with Tashkent Province.

References

External links

Geographic infos about Chilanzar
Picture of a residential building in Chilanzar (from Fr.wiki)

Districts of Tashkent
Populated places established in 1956
1956 establishments in the Soviet Union